Sonata de otoño is a Mexican telenovela produced by Televisa for Telesistema Mexicano in 1966.

Cast 
Prudencia Grifell
Carlos Navarro
Maruja Grifell
Angelines Fernández
Consuelo Monteagudo

References

External links 

Mexican telenovelas
1966 telenovelas
Spanish-language telenovelas
Televisa telenovelas
1966 Mexican television series debuts
1966 Mexican television series endings